In the mathematical field of set theory, the continuum means the real numbers, or the corresponding (infinite) cardinal number, denoted by . Georg Cantor proved that the cardinality  is larger than the smallest infinity, namely, .

The cardinality of the continuum is the size of the set of real numbers. The continuum hypothesis is sometimes stated by saying that no cardinality lies between that of the continuum and that of the natural numbers, or alternatively, that .

Linear continuum  

According to Raymond Wilder (1965), there are four axioms that make a set C and the relation < into a linear continuum:
 C is simply ordered with respect to <.
 If [A,B] is a cut of C, then either A has a last element or B has a first element. (compare Dedekind cut)
 There exists a non-empty, countable subset S of C such that, if x,y ∈ C such that x < y, then there exists z ∈ S such that x < z < y. (separability axiom)
 C has no first element and no last element. (Unboundedness axiom)
These axioms characterize the order type of the real number line.

See also 
 Aleph null
 Suslin's problem
 Transfinite number

References

Bibliography 
 Raymond L. Wilder (1965) The Foundations of Mathematics, 2nd ed., page 150, John Wiley & Sons.
Set theory
Infinity